Jacaranda mimosifolia is a sub-tropical tree native to south-central South America that has been widely planted elsewhere because of its attractive and long-lasting violet-colored flowers.  It is also known as the jacaranda, blue jacaranda, black poui, Nupur or fern tree. Older sources call it J. acutifolia, but it is nowadays more usually classified as J. mimosifolia. In scientific usage, the name "jacaranda" refers to the genus Jacaranda, which has many other members, but in horticultural and everyday usage, it nearly always means the blue jacaranda.

In its native range in the wild, J. mimosifolia is listed as Vulnerable by the IUCN.

Description
Its bark is thin and grey-brown, smooth when the tree is young but eventually becoming finely scaly. The twigs are slender and slightly zigzag; they are a light reddish-brown. They appear in spring and early summer, and last for up to two months. The blue jacaranda is cultivated for the sake of its large compound leaves, even in areas where it rarely blooms. There is a white form available from nurseries.

Wood

The wood is pale grey to whitish, straight-grained, relatively soft and knot-free. It dries without difficulty and is often used in its green or wet state for turnery and bowl carving.

Habitat and range
Jacaranda mimosifolia is native to northwestern Argentina (Salta, Jujuy, and Catamarca provinces) and southern Bolivia. It is found in the Dry Chaco and flooded savannas, and in the Southern Andean Yungas of the eastern Andean piedmont and inter-Andean valleys, up to 2600 meters elevation. In its native range the tree is threatened by uncontrolled logging and clearing of land for agriculture, and is assessed as Vulnerable in the IUCN Red List.

Taxonomy
The taxonomic status of the blue jacaranda is unsettled. ITIS regards the older name, J. acutifolia, as a synonym for J. mimosifolia. However, some modern taxonomists maintain the distinction between these two species, regarding them as geographically distinct: J. acutifolia is endemic to Peru, while J. mimosifolia is native to Bolivia and Argentina. If this distinction is made, cultivated forms should be treated as J. mimosifolia, since they are believed to derive from Argentine stock. Other synonyms for the blue jacaranda are J. chelonia and J. ovalifolia. The blue jacaranda belongs to the section Monolobos of the genus Jacaranda.

Ornamental use
Even when young trees are damaged by a hard frost and suffer dieback, they will often rebound from the roots and grow in a shrub-like, multi-stemmed form. However, flowering and growth will be stunted if the jacaranda is grown directly on the California coast, where a lack of heat combined with cool ocean winds discourages flowering.

This plant has won the Royal Horticultural Society's Award of Garden Merit.

The jacaranda is regarded as an invasive species in parts of South Africa and Queensland, Australia, where it can out-compete native species.

Places known for their jacarandas

Pretoria, the administrative capital of South Africa, is popularly and poetically known as Jacaranda City because of the large number of trees, which turn the city blue and purple when they flower in spring. The jacaranda trees, far from their native Brazil, bloom every October. Water scarcity has South Africa trying to eradicate foreign species of plants and trees, including the jacaranda. Acknowledging the tree's popularity with locals, the government announced in the early 2000s that it would not remove the trees, but had banned the planting of new jacarandas. However this position softened by 2016, and they were again allowed to be planted in urban environments in a number of provinces, although the position of councils like Johannesburg remained uncertain.

The city of Grafton on the north coast of New South Wales, Australia, is famous for its jacarandas.  Each year in late October and early November, the city has a jacaranda festival.

In the United States, the jacaranda is grown extensively in California, the Southwest, southeast Texas and Florida. Jacaranda can be found throughout most of Southern California, where they were imported by the horticulturalist Kate Sessions. They are also planted as far north as the San Francisco Bay Area and along the frost-free coastal regions of Northern California. In San Francisco, they can only be grown in the city's warmest microclimates, such as Potrero Hill and the Mission District. Phoenix, Arizona and San Diego, California are known for them. They also grow in Hawaii.

 Jacarandas can be found in many parts of Mexico City and are usually in full bloom in March.
It's one of the most common trees in Argentina's capital city.
In Europe the jacaranda is grown on the Mediterranean coast of Spain (it is prominent in the Valencian Community, the Balearic Islands and Andalusia, with especially large specimens present in Valencia, Alicante and Seville, and usually with earlier flowering than in the rest of Europe), in southern Portugal (notably in Lisbon), southern Italy (Naples and Cagliari have many mature specimens), southern Greece (especially Athens) and the islands of Malta and Cyprus.

Jacaranda are also widely common in cities across Southern Africa. It was introduced to Cape Town, the legislative capital of South Africa; then Johannesburg; Lusaka,Zambia; Gaborone,Botswana; Nairobi, the capital of Kenya; and Harare,Zimbabwe. Beyond the region, Jacaranda are also cultivated in Kathmandu, the capital of Nepal and Maharashtra, Madhya Pradesh, Karnataka, Kerala, and Jharkhand states in India. As mentioned above, the trees are best associated with spring in the cities of Pretoria and Harare, the respective capitals of South Africa and Zimbabwe.

In popular culture
The Australian Christmas song "Christmas Where The Gum Trees Grow" makes reference to jacaranda trees, as the blooms are only seen in summer time—as the song explains, "When the bloom of the jacaranda tree is here, Christmas time is near". The movie musical  set in Colombia, Encanto, references the plant in the song "What Else Can I Do".  Isabela Madrigal explores her plant-summoning powers, she creates, and mentions by line, "a hurricane of jacarandas". The University of Queensland in Brisbane is particularly well known for its ornamental jacarandas, and a common maxim among students holds that the blooming of the jacarandas signals the time for serious study for end-of-year exams.

In Argentina, writer Alejandro Dolina, in his book Crónicas del Ángel Gris (Chronicles of the Gray Angel), tells the legend of a massive jacarandá tree, planted in Plaza Flores in Buenos Aires, that was able to whistle tango songs on demand. María Elena Walsh dedicated her song Canción del Jacarandá to the tree. Miguel Brascó's folk song Santafesino de veras mentions the aroma of jacarandá as a defining feature of the littoral Santa Fe Province (along with the willows growing by the rivers).

Folklore

Purple panic is a term used by students in south-east Queensland for student stress during the period of late spring and early summer.  The "purple" refers to the flowers of Jacaranda trees, which bloom at that time and have been extensively planted throughout that district. The "panic" refers to the need to be completing assignments and studying for final exams.

The Jacaranda when in bloom is also known as the exam tree.

Conversely, while the time of year the jacarandas bloom in Pretoria coincides with the year-end exams at the University of Pretoria, legend has it there that if a flower from a jacaranda drops on a student's head, the student will pass all their exams.

References

External links

  Listed as Vulnerable (VU B1+2ac v2.3)
 

mimosifolia
Medicinal plants
Ornamental trees
Trees of Argentina
Trees of Bolivia
Trees of Brazil
Trees of temperate climates
Vulnerable plants
Trees of mild maritime climate
Gran Chaco